Samuel "Sticks" Evans (5 February 1923 – 11 April 1994) was an American drummer, percussionist, music teacher, arranger and musical director. He was credited variously as Sammy "Stick" Evans, Samie Evans, Sammy Evans, Sammie Evans, Stick Evans, Sticks Evans, and Belton Evans.

Biography
In 1950, he recorded with the Milt Buckner Orchestra backing Wynonie Harris, and in 1952-3 he was playing and recording with Milt Buckner's Organ Trio. He left the trio in February 1953, and in 1954 he was with the Teddy Wilson Trio with Milt Hinton.

In the early 1960s, he was recording on the Prestige label, credited as Belton Evans, and accompanied on bass by Leonard Gaskin, for blues artists such as Curtis Jones, Sunnyland Slim, Sonny Terry, Big John Greer, LaVern Baker, and King Curtis.

He appears on John Lewis’ Jazz Abstractions album (1961), with Bill Evans, Eric Dolphy, Ornette Coleman and Jim Hall, among others. That same year he was a member of the Ray Bryant Combo backing Aretha Franklin on her second album, Aretha: With The Ray Bryant Combo.

His pupils included Bernard Purdie, Max Neuhaus, and Terry Burrus. Evans died of a stroke, in New York City, in 1994.

Discography
1959: The Wildest Guitar - Mickey Baker
1960: Slim's Shout - Sunnyland Slim
1960: Buck Jumpin', The Al Casey Quartet - Al Casey
1960: Sonny's Story - Sonny Terry 
1960: Slim's Shout – Sunnyland Slim
1960: The Honeydripper - Roosevelt Sykes
1960: Sonny Is King - Sonny Terry 
1960: Lightnin' - Lightnin' Hopkins
1960: Trouble Blues - Curtis Jones
1960: Pre Bird (later re-released as Mingus Revisited) - Charles Mingus
1961: Beauty is a Rare Thing - Ornette Coleman 
1961: Aretha: With The Ray Bryant Combo - Aretha Franklin
1964: Sam Cooke at the Copa - Sam Cooke
1964: Ya! Ya! - Budd Johnson

References

1923 births
1994 deaths
Jazz drummers
American jazz drummers
20th-century American drummers
American male drummers
20th-century American male musicians
American male jazz musicians